BSAT-4a is a geostationary communications satellite ordered by Broadcasting Satellite System Corporation (BSAT) and designed and manufactured by SSL on the SSL 1300 platform, to be stationed on the 110.0° East orbital slot for direct television broadcasting of 4K and 8K Ultra HD resolutions. It was launched on 29 September 2017.

Satellite description 
BSAT-4a was designed and manufactured by SSL on the SSL 1300 satellite bus for BSAT.

It has a single Ku-band payload with 24 transponders, and covers Japan with 4K and 8K Ultra HD television satellite service.

History 
On 18 June 2015, BSAT ordered the first of its fourth generation satellites from SSL, BSAT-4a. It was launched on 29 September 2017. It was planned that 4K and 8K signals would be broadcast by summer 2020.

In September 2015, BSAT contracted Arianespace for an Ariane 5 ECA launch service,and received a preliminary license for broadcasting 4K and 8K Ultra HD.

References 

Communications satellites in geostationary orbit
Satellites using the SSL 1300 bus
Communications satellites of Japan
Satellites of Japan
Ariane commercial payloads
Spacecraft launched in 2017